Papionini is a tribe of Old World monkeys that includes several large monkey species, which include the macaques of North Africa and Asia, as well as the baboons, geladas, mangabeys, kipunji, drills, and mandrills, which are essentially from sub-Saharan Africa (although some baboons also occur in southern Arabia). It is typically divided into two subtribes: Macacina for the genus Macaca and its extinct relatives and the Papionina for all other genera.

Classification 

 Family Cercopithecidae
 Subfamily Cercopithecinae
 Tribe Cercopithecini
 Tribe Papionini
 Genus Macaca - macaques
 Genus Lophocebus - crested mangabeys
 Genus Rungwecebus - highland mangabey (aka kipunji)
 Genus Papio - baboons
 Genus Theropithecus - gelada
 Genus Cercocebus - white-eyelid mangabeys
 Genus Mandrillus - drill and mandrill
Fossil genera
 Genus Dinopithecus
Genus Gorgopithecus
 Genus Paradolichopithecus
 Genus Parapapio
 Genus Pliopapio
 Genus Procercocebus
Genus Procynocephalus
Genus Soromandrillus

References 

 
Mammal tribes
Extant Pliocene first appearances
Pliocene primates
Taxa named by Gilbert Thomas Burnett
Taxa described in 1828